This is a list of notable events in music that took place in 1931.

Specific locations
1931 in British music
1931 in Norwegian music

Specific genres
1931 in country music
1931 in jazz

Events
January 24
Mary Garden makes her last appearance with Chicago Opera, before retiring to her native Scotland.
The Romen Theatre opens as a studio in Moscow.
May 14 – After conducting a concert in memory of Giuseppe Martucci in Bologna, Arturo Toscanini is attacked by a crowd for having refused to perform the fascist Italian national anthem on the program.
May 21 – RCA Victor's first commercially issued  rpm record, "Salon Suite, No. 1" by The Victor Salon Orchestra, directed by Nathaniel Shilkret, is recorded.
May 23 – Edward Elgar's Nursery Suite receives its premiere in a recording studio (Kingsway Hall, London).
July 22–28 – The ninth annual ISCM Festival of Contemporary Music takes place in London and Oxford, with concerts of orchestral, choral and chamber music.
October 20 – The Indian Music Circle, dedicated to the revival of Indian classical music, is inaugurated with a ceremony held in the Jinnah Memorial Hall, Bombay.
 December 31 – Record sales dropped 75% from 1929

Published popular music
 "Adios"     w. Eddie Wood m. Enric Madriguera
 "All of Me"     w.m. Seymour Simons & Gerald Marks
 "As Time Goes By"     w.m. Herman Hupfeld
 "At Your Command"     w.m. Harry Barris, Bing Crosby & Harry Tobias
 "Black Jazz"     m. Gene Gifford
 "Blah, Blah, Blah"     w. Ira Gershwin m. George Gershwin.  Introduced by El Brendel in the film Delicious
 "Blues in My Heart"     w. Irving Mills m. Benny Carter
 "Bend Down, Sister" w. Ballard MacDonald & David Silverstein m. Con Conrad.  From the musical film Palmy Days.
 "Brighter Than The Sun"     w. Anona Winn m. Ray Noble
 "Brother, Can You Spare a Dime?"     w. E. Y. Harburg m. Jay Gorney
 "By The River Sainte Marie"     w. Edgar Leslie m. Harry Warren
 "Call Me Darling, Call Me Sweetheart, Call Me Dear"     w. (Eng) Dorothy Dick w.m. Bert Reisfeld, Mart Fryberg & Rolf Marbet
 "Close Your Eyes"     D. Carter – H. M. Tennent
 "Come to Me"     w. B. G. De Sylva & Lew Brown m. Ray Henderson
 "Concentratin' On You"     w. Andy Razaf m. Fats Waller
 "Crosby, Columbo And Vallee"     w. Al Dubin m. Joe Burke
 "Cuban Love Song"     w.m. Dorothy Fields, Jimmy McHugh & Herbert Stothart
 "Dancing In The Dark"     w. Howard Dietz m. Arthur Schwartz
"Delishious"     w. Ira Gershwin m. George Gershwin
 "Doin' What I Please"   w. Andy Razaf m. Thomas Waller
 "Don't Take My Boop-Oop-A-Doop Away" w. Sammy Timberg m. Samuel Lerner.  Introduced by Mae Questel and Rudy Vallee in the Betty Boop animated short Musical Justice (1931)
 "Down Sunnyside Lane"     Jimmy Campbell, Reg Connelly
 "Dream a Little Dream of Me"     w. Gus Kahn m. Fabian Andre & Wilbur Schwandt
 "An Evening In Caroline"     w.m. Walter Donaldson
 "A Faded Summer Love"     w.m. Phil Baxter
 "Goodnight, Sweetheart"     w.m. Ray Noble, James Campbell & Reg Connelly
 "Got A Date With An Angel"     w. Clifford Grey & Sonny Miller m. Jack Waller & Joseph Tunbridge
 "Got the Bench, Got the Park"     w.m. Al Sherman, Al Lewis & Fred Phillips
 "Green Eyes"     w. (Eng) E. Rivera & Eddie Woods (Sp) Adolfo Utrero m. Nilo Menendez
 "Guilty"     w. Gus Kahn m. Richard A. Whiting & Harry Akst
 "Hang Out The Stars In Indiana"     w. Billy Moll m. Harry Woods
 "He Played His Ukulele As The Ship Went Down"     w.m. Arthur Le Clerq
 "Heartaches"     w. John Clenner m. Al Hoffman
 "Hello, My Lover, Goodbye" w. Edward Heyman m. John Green. Introduced by Frances Langford in the musical Here Goes the Bride
 "Help Yourself to Happiness" w.m. Mack Gordon, Harry Revel and Harry Richman.  Introduced by Harry Richman in the revue Ziegfeld Follies of 1931
 "Hold My Hand"     w. Douglas Furber m. Noel Gay
 "Home"     w.m. Peter Van Steeden, Harry Clarkson & Geoff Clarkson
 "Hoops"     w. Howard Dietz m. Arthur Schwartz
 "I Apologize"     w.m. Al Hoffman, Al Goodhart & Ed Nelson
 "I Don't Know Why"     w. Roy Turk m. Fred E. Ahlert
 "I Found A Million Dollar Baby (In A Five And Ten Cent Store)"     w. Billy Rose & Mort Dixon m. Harry Warren
 "I Heard"     w.m. Don Redman
 "I Love Louisa"     w. Howard Dietz m. Arthur Schwartz
 "I Surrender, Dear"     w. Gordon Clifford m. Harry Barris
 "If You Should Ever Need Me"     w. Al Dubin m. Joe Burke
 "I'll Be Good Because Of You"     w.m. Ray Noble & Alan Murray
 "I'm All Dressed Up With A Broken Heart"     Fisher, Unger, Stern
 "I'm Crazy 'Bout My Baby"     w. Alex Hill m. Fats Waller
 "I'm Gonna Get You"     w.m. Gus Arnheim, Harry Tobias & Jules Lemare
 "I'm Good For Nothing But Love"     Ballard, Maltin
 "I'm Through with Love"     w. Gus Kahn m. Matty Malneck & Fud Livingston
 "It isnae me" w. Sally Holmes m. Edward Elgar
 "It's the Darndest Thing"     w. Dorothy Fields m. Jimmy McHugh
 "It's the Girl" w. Dave Oppenheim m. Abel Baer
 "It's You!"     Razaf, Waller
 "I've Got Five Dollars"     w. Lorenz Hart m. Richard Rodgers
 "Jazz Nocturne"     m. Dana Suesse
 "Just One More Chance"     w. Sam Coslow m. Arthur Johnston
 "Kicking The Gong Around"     w. Ted Koehler m. Harold Arlen
 "A Lady Must Live" w. Lorenz Hart m. Richard Rodgers.  Introduced by Jeanne Aubert in the musical America's Sweetheart
 "Lady Of Spain"     w.m. Robert Hargreaves, Tolchard Evans, Stanley J. Damerell & Henry J. Tilsley
 "Lies"     w. George E. Springer m. Harry Barris
 "Life Is Just A Bowl Of Cherries"     w. B. G. De Sylva & Lew Brown m. Ray Henderson
 "Little Girl"     w.m. Madeline Hyde & Francis Henry
 "Love Is Sweeping The Country"     w. Ira Gershwin m. George Gershwin
 "Love Letters In The Sand"     w. Nick Kenny & Charles Kenny m. J. Fred Coots
 "Lullaby Of The Leaves"     w. Joe Young m. Bernice Petkere
 "Mad Dogs And Englishmen"     w.m. Noël Coward
 "Makin' Faces At The Man In The Moon"     w.m. Max Rich, Kate Smith, Al Hoffman & Ned Washington
 "Mama Inez"     w. (Eng) L. Wolfe Gilbert m. Eliseo Grenet
 "Maria, My Own"     w. (Eng) L. Wolfe Gilbert m. Ernesto Lecuona
 "Marta"     w. (Eng) L. Wolfe Gilbert m. Moises Simons
 "Mary (I'm in Love with You)" w.m. J. Fred Coots & Ozzie Nelson
 "Mausie"     w. (Eng) Harry Graham m. Paul Abraham
 "Me!"     w.m. Irving Berlin
 "(There Ought to Be a) Moonlight Saving Time"     w.m. Irving Kahal & Harry Richman
 "My Canary Has Circles Under His Eyes"     Koehler, Pola, Golden
 "My Song"     w. Lew Brown m. Ray Henderson
 "Nevertheless"     w. Bert Kalmar m. Harry Ruby
 "Now's The Time To Fall In Love"     w.m. Al Sherman & Al Lewis
 "Of Thee I Sing"     w. Ira Gershwin m. George Gershwin
 "Oh, Monah"     w.m. Ted Weems & Joe "Country" Washburn
 "One More Time"  w.m. B. G. DeSylva, Lew Brown, and Ray Henderson.
 "Ooh That Kiss"     w. Mort Dixon & Joe Young m. Harry Warren
 "Out Of Nowhere"     w. Edward Heyman m. John Green
 "Paradise"     w. Nacio Herb Brown & Gordon Clifford m. Nacio Herb Brown
 "Penthouse Serenade (When We're Alone)"     w.m. Will Jason & Val Burton
 "Pied Piper Of Hamelin"     w.m. Noel Gay
 "Poor Pierrot"     w. Otto Harbach m. Jerome Kern
 "Prisoner Of Love"     w. Leo Robin m. Russ Columbo & Clarence Gaskill
 "River, Stay 'Way From My Door"     w. Mort Dixon m. Harry Woods
 "Roll On, Mississippi, Roll On"     w.m. James McCaffrey, Eugene West & Dave Ringle
 "Running Between The Raindrops"     w. James Dyrenforth m. Carroll Gibbons
 "Sally"     w.m. William Haines, Harry Leon & Leo Towers
 "Shadrack"     w.m. Robert MacGimsey
 "She Didn't Say Yes"     w. Otto Harbach m. Jerome Kern. Introduced by Bettina Hall in the musical The Cat and the Fiddle.
 "Smile, Darn Ya, Smile"     w. Charles O'Flynn & Jack Meskill m. Max Rich
 "Somebody from Somewhere" w. Ira Gershwin m. George Gershwin.  Introduced by Janet Gaynor in the film Delicious
 "Sweet And Lovely"     w.m. Gus Arnheim, Harry Tobias & Jules Lemare
 "Thanks To You"     w. Grant Clarke m. Pete Wendling
 "That Silver Haired Daddy Of Mine"     w.m. Jimmy Long & Gene Autry
 "That's My Desire"     w. Carroll Loveday m. Helmy Kresa
 "This Is The Missus"     w.m. Lew Brown & Ray Henderson
 "The Thrill Is Gone"     w.m. Lew Brown & Ray Henderson
 "Till The Real Thing Comes Along"     w.m. Mann Holiner, Alberta Nichols. Introduced by Ethel Waters in the Broadway revue Rhapsody in Black. (Not to be confused with the 1936 song "Until the Real Thing Comes Along," which is a related composition with a new melody by Saul Chaplin and new words by Sammy Cahn.)
 "Twentieth Century Blues"     w.m. Noël Coward
 "Under the Bridges of Paris"     w. (Fr) Jean Rodor, (Eng) Dorcas Cochran m. Vincent Scotto
 "Underneath The Arches"     w.m. Reg Connelly & Bud Flanagan
 "Wabash Moon"     w.m. Dave Dreyer & Morton Downey
 "Was I?" w. Charles Farrell m. Chick Endor from the revue Ziegfeld Follies Of 1931
 "Was That The Human Thing To Do?"     w. Joe Young m. Sammy Fain
 "We'll Be The Same"     w. Lorenz Hart m. Richard Rodgers
 "Were You Sincere"     w. Jack Meskill m. Vincent Rose
 "When I Take My Sugar To Tea"     w.m. Sammy Fain, Irving Kahal & Pierre Norman Connor
 "When It's Sleepy Time Down South"     w.m. Leon Rene, Otis Rene & Clarence Muse
 "When The Bloom Is On The Sage"     w.m. Nat Vincent & Fred Howard Wright
 "When The Moon Comes Over The Mountain"     w.m. Howard Johnson, Harry Woods & Kate Smith
 "When Your Lover Has Gone"     w.m. E. A. Swan
 "When Yuba Plays The Rumba On The Tuba"     w.m. Herman Hupfeld
 "Where The Blue Of The Night"     w.m. Roy Turk, Bing Crosby & Fred E. Ahlert
 "Who Cares?" w. Ira Gershwin m. George Gershwin. Introduced by William Gaxton and Lois Moran in the musical Of Thee I Sing
 "Wrap Your Troubles In Dreams"     w. Ted Koehler & Billy Moll m. Harry Barris
 "Yes, Yes, My Baby Said Yes, Yes"     Cliff Friend, Con Conrad.  Introduced by Eddie Cantor in the film Palmy Days
 "You Are My Heart's Delight"     w. Harry Graham m. Franz Lehár Music 1923
 "You Call It Madness (But I Call It Love)"     w.m. Con Conrad, Gladys Du Bois, Russ Columbo & Paul Gregory
 "You Can't Stop Me From Loving You"     w. Mann Holiner m. Alberta Nichols
 "You Forgot Your Gloves" w. Edward Eliscu m. Ned Lehac.  Introduced by Constance Carpenter and Carl Randall in the revue The Third Little Show
 "You Rascal You"     w.m. Sam Theard
 "You Try Somebody Else"     w. B. G. De Sylva & Lew Brown m. Ray Henderson
 "You're Blasé"     w. Bruce Sievier m. Ord Hamilton
 "You're My Decline And Fall"     George Posford
 "You're My Everything"     w. Mort Dixon & Joe Young m. Harry Warren
 "Yours" (orig. "Quiéreme Mucho")     w. (Eng) Jack Sherr (Sp) Augustin Rodriguez m. Gonzalo Roig

Top Popular Recordings 1931

There were many talented writers, producers and performers in the music industry during 1931, but record sales were very low. 
After $75 million in sales during 1929, the stock market crash in October nearly destroyed the industry, after forty years of consistent operation. Sales fell to $18 million in 1930 and then $5.5 million in 1931, where they remained for the next four years. The top selling records of 1929 ranged from $500,000 and up, fell under $100,000 in 1930, $60k in 1931 and $20k in 1932, where they stayed for several years. Keep this in mind when reviewing sales figures. You may also notice less artists and records. Record companies were afraid of taking more losses, such as gambling on new artists and new styles. Guy Lombardo's recording schedule was unaffected because his releases always sold well, but there were few new acts. Most of the records released in 1931 came from Radio Corporation of America (Victor), Columbia/Okeh, Brunswick (now owned by Warner Brothers Studios) and American Record Corporation (ARC), which featured discounted "dime store" labels.

The top popular records of 1931 listed below were compiled from Joel Whitburn's Pop Memories 1890–1954, record sales reported on the "Discography of American Historical Recordings" website, and other sources as specified. Numerical rankings are approximate, there were no Billboard charts in 1931, the numbers are only used for a frame of reference.

Top Blues Recordings
"Devil Got My Woman" – Skip James
"Hard Time Killin' Floor Blues" – Skip James
"I'm So Glad" – Skip James
"Uncle Ned, Don't Use Your Head" – Lonnie Johnson
"Southern Can is Mine" – Blind Willie McTell
"Broke Down Engine Blues" – Blind Willie McTell
"Georgia Rag" – Blind Willie McTell

Classical music
Jean Absil – Trio for violin, cello, and piano, op. 7
Joseph Achron – Quartet for Cello, Trumpet, Horn, and Piano, Golem
Jehan Alain –
Dans le rêve laissé par la ballade des pendus de Villon, for piano
En dévissant mes chaussettes, for piano
Heureusement, la bonne fé sa marraine y mit bon ordre, for piano
Histoire dur des tapis, entre des murs blancs, for piano
Lumière qui tombe d'un vasistas, for piano
Mélodie-sandwich, for piano
Nocturne, for piano
Petite rhapsodie, for piano
Verset-choral, for piano
26 septembre, 1931, for piano
Karel Albert – Oedipus a Colonus, incidental music for the play by Sophocles
Franco Alfano – 
Due intermezzi, for strings 
Vesuvius (Hic est illa Napolis), ballet, for orchestra
Hugo Alfvén – Swedish Rhapsody No. 3 (Dalarapsodien), for orchestra, op. 47
Hendrik Andriessen –
Hymnus "Te Joseph celebrent", for soprano, baritone, and organ
Missa pro defunctis, for three voices and organ
"O quam suavis est", for two voices and organ
Sonata No. 2, for violin and piano
George Antheil – Six Little Pieces, for string quartet
Hans Erich Apostel – Fünf Lieder, for low voice and piano or orchestra, op. 3
Dina Appeldoorn – Zes kantoj
Blaž Arnič – Concerto for Organ and Percussion
Kurt Atterberg – Suite No. 8, for orchestra (Suite pastorale in modo antico), op. 34
Georges Auric –
À nous la liberté (music for the film by René Clair),
La concurrence (ballet)
Le quatorze juillet (incidental music for the play by Romain Rolland)
Daniel Ayala – 
Radiogramma, for piano
Uchben X'coholte, for soprano and chamber orchestra
Grażyna Bacewicz – Suite, for string orchestra
Henk Badings –
Sextet, for alto voice, flute, clarinet, violin, viola, and piano
Sonata, for violin and piano [unnumbered, precedes Sonata No. 1]
String Quartet No. 1
Samuel Barber –
Dover Beach, for mezzo-soprano or baritone and string quartet, op. 3
 Pieces for Carillon: Round, Allegro, Legend
The School for Scandal (overture), for orchestra, op. 5
Béla Bartók –
Duos (Forty-four), for two violins
Hungarian Sketches, for orchestra
Piano Concerto No. 2
Transylvanian Dances, for orchestra
Marion Bauer – "Here at High Morning", for male chorus, op. 27
Arnold Bax
Northern Ballad No. 1, for orchestra
Red Autumn, for piano duo
Symphony No. 4
The Tale the Pine-Trees Knew, for orchestra
Valse, for harp
Amy Beach –
"Christ in the universe", for alto, tenor, four-part choir, and orchestra, or organ, op. 132
"Juni", for four-part choir and piano (also version for three-part female choir), op. 51, no. 3
Prelude, for violin, cello, and piano
Sea Fever and The Last Prayer, for four-part male choir and piano, op. 126, nos. 1 and 2
"When the last sea is sailed", for four-part male choir and piano, op. 127
Paul Ben-Haim –
Concerto Grosso, for orchestra
Entrückung, for baritone and piano
Pan, for soprano and orchestra
Lennox Berkeley –
La poulette grise, for two children's choirs, trumpet, and two pianos
Sonata No.1, for violin and piano
Boris Blacher –
Concerto, for two trumpets and string orchestra
Concert Overture, for orchestra
Fünf Sinnsprüche Omars des Zeltmachers, for mezzo-soprano or baritone and piano, op. 3
Toccatas (two), for piano
Trio, for violin, viola, and cello
Zwei estnische Nationaltänze, for piano (later destroyed)
Marc Blitzstein – Piano Concerto
Paul Bowles –
In the Platinum Forest, for medium voice and piano
Sonata, for oboe and clarinet
Tamanar, for piano
Luis de Freitas Branco – Lembrança, for four-part male choir
Havergal Brian –
The Battle Song, symphonic poem, for brass band
Symphony No. 2 in E minor
Frank Bridge – Phantasm, for piano and orchestra
Benjamin Britten –
Christ's Nativity, Christmas Suite, for SATB choir
Fugue in A major, for piano
Plymouth Town, ballet, for orchestra
Rhapsodies, for violin, viola, and piano
String Quartet in D
Tit for Tat , for voice and piano
Twelve Variations, for piano
Willy Burkhard – 
 Fantasie, for organ, op. 32
Kleine Stücke, for piano, op. 31
Te Deum, for two-voice chorus, trumpet, trombone, timpani, and organ, op. 33
Vierundzwanzig Melodien aus den Hassler'schen Choralgesängen, for four-voice choir, op. 30
John Alden Carpenter – Song of Faith, for SATB choir and orchestra
Julián Carrillo –
Estudio (A media noche en oriental), for -tone guitar
Estudios, for -tone arpa-citara
Preludios, for mictotonal arpa-citara
Sonata "Amanecer en Berlin 13", for -tone arpa-citara
Symphony No. 3 "Colombia"
Elliott Carter – Philoctetes (incidental music for the play by Sophocles), for tenor, baritone, male chorus, oboe, and percussion
Alfredo Casella – 
La donna serpente, Suite No. 1, op. 50 bis
La donna serpente, Suite No. 2, op. 50 ter
Mario Castelnuovo-Tedesco – 
Ballade des biens immeubles, for voice and piano, op. 68
Concerto "I profeti", for violin and orchestra, op. 66
The Lark, for violin and piano, op. 64
Mi–la, for piano
Film Studies (Two), for piano, op. 67
Juan José Castro – Symphony No. 1
Abram Chasins – Parade, for orchestra
Francesco Cilea – Suite No. 2, for orchestra
Philip Greeley Clapp –
A Highly Academic Diversion on Seven Notes, for orchestra
Symphony No. 9 in E major (The Pioneers)
Arnold Cooke – Passacaglia, Scherzo, and Finale, for flute, oboe, clarinet, bassoon, and string quartet
Aaron Copland – Miracle at Verdun, incidental music for the play by Hans Chlumberg, chamber orchestra
Henry Cowell –
479 [Gig], for piano
Competitive Sport, for piano
Heroic Dance, for ten instruments
"How Old Is Song?", for voice and piano
Rhythmicana, for rhythmicon and orchestra
Steel and Stone, original version, for piano?
Jean Cras – Concerto for Piano and Orchestra
Ruth Crawford Seeger – String Quartet
Nancy Dalberg – Tre danske Duetter, for voices
Georges Dandelot – Chansons de Bilitis, for voice and piano, second set
Johann Nepomuk David – Kleine Präludien und Fugen, in A minor and G major, for organ
Maurice Delage – Deux fables de Jean de La Fontaine, for voice, flute, oboe, two clarinets, bassoon, horn, trumpet, piano, and string quartet
Frederick Delius –
Fantastic Dance, for orchestra
Irmelin Prelude, for orchestra*Marcel Dupré –
Chorales (79), for organ, op. 28
Pieces (Seven), for organ, op. 27
Vernon Duke – 
Ballade, for piano and chamber orchestra
Printemps, for piano
George Dyson – The Canterbury Pilgrims (G. Chaucer), for soprano, tenor, baritone, choir, and orchestra
Sophie Carmen Eckhardt-Gramatté – 
Piano Concerto No. 1 (revised version)
Grave funèbre, for violin and chamber orchestra
Werner Egk –
Blasmusik No. 1, for wind orchestra
Blasmusik No. 2, for wind orchestra 
Furchtlosigkeit und Wohlwollen, oratorio for tenor, mixed chorus, and orchestra
Musica per banda, for wind orchestra
Hanns Eisler –
Lied der roten Flieger, for voice and small orchestra or piano
Das Lied vom vierten Mann, for voice and small orchestra or piano
Die Mutter, for choir and orchestra, op. 25
 Songs (Four) from the film Niemandsland
 Songs (Three) from the film Kuhle Wampe, oder Wem gehört die Welt?, op. 27
 Songs (Three) from the film Das Lied vom Leben, op. 36
 Streiklied, for voice and small orchestra or piano
 Suite No. 2, for orchestra, (from the film Niemandsland), op. 24
 Suite No. 3, for orchestra (from the film Kuhle Wampe), op. 26
Edward Elgar
Nursery Suite
Soliloquy, for oboe and orchestra
Heino Eller – 
Elegy, for harp and string orchestra
String Quartet No. 2
Ulvi Cemal Erkin – Beş damla, for piano
Ferenc Farkas – 
Alla danza ungherese, for orchestra
Canephorae, five pieces for piano or organ
Passacaglia, for organ
Pastorali, for voice and piano or chamber orchestra
Quaderno Romano, six pieces for piano
Sonatina No. 2, for violin and piano
Samuel Feinberg – Piano Concerto No. 1
Jacobo Ficher – Sonata, for flute, viola, and piano, op. 18
Gerald Finzi – To Joy, for voice and piano, op. 13
Wolfgang Fortner – 
Grenzen der Menschheit, for baritone, five-part choir, and orchestra
Lied der Welt, for male choir
Isadore Freed – String Quartet
Noël Gallon – Sonatine, for piano
Alejandro García Caturla –
El caballo blanco, for four-part mixed choir
Rumba, for chamber orchestra
Suite cubana No. 1, for chamber orchestra (also chamber version for flute, oboe, cor anglais, clarinet, bass clarinet, bassoon, horn, piano, and timpani)
Yamba-O, for orchestra
 –
Acalanto, for soprano and piano
Aquela china, for voice and piano
Balada para os carreteiros, for baritone and piano
Mãe d'agua canta, for violin and piano, or for string quartet
Roberto Gerhard – Sis cançons populars catalanes, for soprano or tenor and orchestra
George Gershwin – Second Rhapsody, for piano and orchestra
Vittorio Giannini – 
Madrigal, for four solo voice and string quartet
Quintet, for two violins, viola, cello, and piano
Suite, for orchestra
Trio, for violin, cello, and piano
Cecil Armstrong Gibbs –
The Flooded Stream, for voice and piano
The Orchard Sings to the Child, for voice and piano
Padraic the Fidiler, for voice and piano, with violin ad libitum
Pieces (two), for clarinet and piano
Alexander Glazunov – "Concerto ballata" in C major, for cello and orchestra, op. 108
Reinhold Glière – Comedians (ballet)
Radamés Gnattali – 
Para meu Rancho, for voice and piano
Poemas (Tres), for voice and piano
Rapsódia brasileira, for piano
Leopold Godowsky – 
Capriccio, for piano left-hand
Etude (paraphrase of Adolf Henselt), in F major, for piano, op. 2 no. 6
Berthold Goldschmidt – 
Die Herde sucht (incidental music)
Zwei Betrachtungen (later retitled Letzte Kapitel), for speaker, chamber choir, piano, and percussion, op. 15 
Eugene Aynsley Goossens –
Autumn Crocus (incidental music)
Songs (Two), op. 49
Songs (Four), op. 53
Percy Grainger –
Lisbon (Dublin Bay) (second setting)
Tribute to Foster
Alexander Gretchaninov – Sonata, for piano, op. 129
Ferde Grofé –
Grand Canyon Suite, for orchestra
Knute Rockne, symphonic poem, for orchestra
Camargo Guarnieri –
Concerto No. 1, for piano and orchestra
Poemas de Macunaíma, for voice and orchestra
Sonata No. 1, for cello and piano
Trio, for violin, viola, and cello
Alois Hába  –
Fantazie No. 1, for nonet, op. 40
Toccata quasi una fantasia, for piano, op. 38
Henry Hadley –
Aurora Borealis, overture for orchestra
San Francisco, suite for orchestra, in C major, op. 121
Youth Triumphant, overture for band
Johan Halvorsen – Danses norvégiennes Nos. 3–6,  for violin and orchestra [originally with piano accompaniment, 1930]
Roy Harris – 
American Portrait (revised version)
Andantino, for orchestra
Concert Piece, for orchestra
Toccata, for orchestra
Karl Amadeus Hartmann – 
Sonatina, for piano
Tanzsuite, for wind quintet
Alfred Hill – Mass in E major
Paul Hindemith –
Duette, for two violins
Einige Klavierstücke, for piano
Fünf-und-Vierzig Stücke, for 1 and 2 violins 
Konzertstück,  for trautonium and strings
Musik zu einem abstrakten Fischinger-Film, for string trio
Musik zu einen Trickfilm, for piano
Reklamefilm Clermont de Fouet, for string trio
Spiel- und Hörschule
"Der Tod", for TTBB choir
Das Unaufhörliche (oratorio), for soprano, tenor, baritone, bass, mixed choir, children's choir, orchestra, and organ
Vagn Holmboe – 
Allegro affettuoso, for piano
Allegro sostenuto, for violin and piano
Chamber Music No. 1, for chamber orchestra
Choral Pieces, for children's chorus
Concerto for chamber orchestra
Concerto, for solo piano
Duets, for two recorders
Provinsen [The Provinces], for soprano, alto, tenor, baritone, choir, flute, oboe, violin, and cello
Requiem, for children's voices, children's chorus, and chamber orchestra
Gustav Holst – Twelve Welsh Folk Songs, for choir, H183
Arthur Honegger – Cris du monde (oratorio), for solo voices, children's chorus, mixed chorus, and orchestra
Alan Hovhaness – Boreas and Mount Wildcat, for orchestra op. 2a
Mary Howe –
Dirge, for orchestra
Der Einsame, for voice and piano
Liebeslied, for voice and piano 
Mailied, for voice and piano 
Schlaflied, for voice and piano
Suite mélancolique, for violin, cello, and piano
Whimsy, for piano
Herbert Howells – 
"Delicates so dainty", unison voices and piano
"A Maid Peerless", for SSAA choir and orchestra 
Severn, for SATB choir
"Sweet Content", for unison voices and piano
Three Folksongs, for voice and piano
Jacques Ibert – 
Les cinq gentlemen maudits, music for the film by J. Duvivier
S.O.S. Foch, music for the film by J. Arroy
Symphonie marine, for orchestra
Vincent d'Indy –
Chanson en forme de canon à l'octave, for soprano and baritone, op. 102
Chant de nourrice, for three equal voices, op. 103
Cinq chansons folkloriques et deux rigaudons à une voix, for voice and piano
Le forgeron, for three-part choir and string quartet, op. 104
String Quartet No. 4 (unfinished)
La vengeance du mari, soprano, two tenors, four-part choit, small wind band or piano, op. 105
John Ireland – Songs Sacred and Profane, for voice and piano
Charles Ives – The Fourth of July, from A Symphony: New England Holidays (revised version)
Gordon Jacob –
Passacaglia on a Well-Known Theme, for orchestra
Songs (Three), for soprano and clarinet
Dorothy James – Symphonic Fragments (Three), for orchestra
André Jolivet – 
 Études (Six), for piano
Mélodies sur des poésies anciennes (Quatre), for voice and piano or chamber orchestra
Prière des 13 hommes dans la mine, for baritone or mezzo-soprano and piano
Rondels de François Villon (Trois), for voice and piano
Suite, for viola and piano
Joseph Jongen – 
Pièces en trio, for violin, cello, and piano, op. 95, 
String Quartet No. 5, op. 95
Manolis Kalomiris –  [Symphony of Simple and Kind-Hearted People], for choir and orchestra
Sigfrid Karg-Elert – 
Music for Organ, op. 145
Passacaglia and Fugue on BACH, op. 150
Sempre semplice, for organ, op. 142, no. 2
Albert Ketèlbey – In the Mystic Land of Egypt
Aram Khachaturian – Double Fugue, for string quartet
Uuno Klami –
Hommage à Haendel, for orchestra
Kohtauksia nukketeatterista [Scenes from a Puppet Theatre], for orchestra
Rag-Time and Blues, for two violins, clarinet, trumpet, and piano
Tsheremissiläinen fantasia [Cheremis Fantasia], for cello and orchestra
Lev Knipper – Negrityonok Sėbi [Little Negro Sebi], ballet for orchestra, op. 24
Zoltán Kodály –
Mátrai képek, for mixed choir
Nagyszalontai köszöntő, for mixed choir or treble choir
Prelude, for organ
Erich Wolfgang Korngold – Piano Sonata No. 3 in C major, op. 25
Charles Koechlin –
Chorals (22), op. 117
Chorals dans les modes du moyen-âge (Cinq), for orchestra, op. 117bis
Ernst Krenek –
Bagatelles (Four), for piano four-hands, op. 70
Durch die Nacht, song cycle, for soprano and orchestra, op. 67a
Die Nachtigall, concert aria, for coloratura soprano and orchestra, op. 68a
Gesänge des späten Jahres, for voice and piano, op. 71
Theme and Thirteen Variations, for orchestra, op. 69
Paul Ladmirault – En Fôret
László Lajtha – Concerto, for violin and orchestra, op. 15
Constant Lambert – 
Concerto for Piano & 9 Instruments
Salome (incidental music for the play by Oscar Wilde), for clarinet, trumpet, cello, and percussion
Lars-Erik Larsson – Duo, for violin and viola, op. 6 
Marc Lavry – Jewish Suite, for string quartet
Jón Leifs –
Íslendingaljóð [Poems of Icelanders], for male choir, op. 15a
Íslenskir söngdansar [Icelandic Dance-Songs], for voices with ad lib instrumental accompaniment, op. 17a
Ný rímnadanslög [New Icelandic Dances], for piano, op. 14b
Preludes (Three), for organ, op. 16
Sjávarvísur [Ocean Verses], for male choir, op. 15b
George Frederick McKay – Trio, for violin, cello, and piano
Alexander Mackenzie – Partsongs (Two), for four-part mixed choir and piano, op. 92
Elizabeth Maconchy –
A Hymn to Christ, A Hymn to God the Father, for double choir
The Leaden Echo and the Golden Echo, for choir and orchestra
The Willow Plate (dramatic work in three parts, unfinished)
Gian Francesco Malipiero –
Concerti, for orchestra
Epitaffio, for piano
String Quartet No. 3 "Cantari alla madrigalesca"
Igor Markevitch – Serenade for Three Instruments
Frank Martin – La nique à Satan (spectacle populaire), for baritone, children's choir, female choir, male choir, wind instruments, 2 pianos, percussion, and contrabass
Bohuslav Martinů –
Borova, for oboe, clarinet, trumpet, piano, and strings
Concerto for String Quartet and Orchestra
Doux esquisses, for piano
Jeux, for piano
Partita (Suite No. 1), for string orchestra
Sept études rhythmiques, for violin and piano
Seven Arabesques, for violin and piano
, for orchestra
Sonata No. 2, for violin and piano
"Staročeská říkadla", for women's choir
Untitled Pieces (four), for piano
Nikolai Medtner –
Leichte Klavierstücke (Zwei), in B major and A minor, for piano
Sonata minacciosa in F minor, for piano, op. 53, no. 2
Erkki Melartin –
Festliches Präludium, for organ
Höstkvällen, for voice and piano, op. 170, no. 2
Hvarje årstid, for voice and piano, op. 171
Långt från land, for voice and piano
Lohdutus [Consolation], for chamber orchestra, op. 168
Muistathan [Do you remember?], for voice and piano (composed under the pseudonym Eero Mela)
Runebergsånger, for voice and piano, op. 172
Sånger till ord av Jarl Hemmer, for voice and piano, op. 162
Sonata, for flute and harp, op. 135b
 Sonatina No. 2, for piano, op. 135a
Törnet, for voice and piano, op. 170, no. 3
Olivier Messiaen – 
L'ensorceleuse, cantata for soprano, tenor, bass, and piano or orchestra
Fugue sur un sujet de Georges Hüe, for four unspecified instruments
Le tombeau resplendissant, for orchestra
Darius Milhaud – Sonata for organ, op. 112
Ernest John Moeran – 
Suffolk Folksongs (Six), for voice and piano
Trio, for violin, viola, and cello
Whythorne's Shadow, for orchestra
Federico Mompou – Comptines I–III, for voice and piano
Carl Nielsen –
Allegretto, in F ,major, for two recorders
Commotio, for organ, op. 50
"Det som lysner over vangen", for voice and piano
Klaverstykke, for piano
"Kvadet om Nordens harpe", for TTBB choir
Ligbraendings–Kantate, for choir and orchestra
Paaske-aften (incidental music)
Gösta Nystroem – Sinfonia breve (Symphony No. 1)
Carl Orff –
Cantata (Werkbuch II), for choir, piano, and percussion
Catulli Carmina II, for choir
Leo Ornstein – Preludes (Six), for cello and piano
Paul Paray – Mass for the 500th Anniversary of the Death of Joan of Arc
Harry Partch –
"By the Waters of Babylon", for voice and adapted viola
Potion Scene from Romeo and Juliet (Shakespeare), for voice and adapted viola
Juan Carlos Paz –
Suite for Emperor and Galilean by Henrik Ibsen, for orchestra
Pieces (Three), for orchestra
Sonata, for vioin and piano
Wilhelm Peterson-Berger – 
Danslek ur Ran [Dance Game from Ran],  for choir a capella or choir and piano
Jämtlandssången [Song of Jämtland], for unison choir and piano
Hans Pfitzner –
Lieder (Sechs), for voice and piano, op. 40
Sonette (Drei), op. 41
Willem Pijper – Sonata, for unaccompanied violin
Mario Pilati – 
Canzoni popolari italiane (Quattro), for small orchestra
String Quartet in A major
Walter Piston – Suite, for oboe and piano
Ildebrando Pizzetti – Introduzione all'Agamennone, for choir and orchestra
Quincy Porter –
Songs for Helen on Nursery Rhymes (Twelve), for voice and piano
String Quartet No. 4
Francis Poulenc –
Cinq poèmes de Max Jacob, for voice and piano
Concertino, for piano four hands
Quatre poèmes de Guillaume Apollinaire, for voice and piano
Sonata for Violin and Piano
Trois poèmes de Louise Lalanne, for voice and piano
Sergei Prokofiev – Piano Concerto No. 4, for left hand, written for Paul Wittgenstein
Sergei Rachmaninoff – 
Sonata no. 2, for piano, in B minor, op. 36 (revised version)
Variations on a Theme of Corelli, for piano, op. 42
Maurice Ravel – Piano Concerto in G
Ottorino Respighi –
Antiche danze ed arie per liuto, Suite No. 3, for string quartet 
Belkis, regina di Saba (ballet), for orchestra
Maria egiziaca (trittico da concerto), for voices and orchestra
Silvestre Revueltas –
Duo para pato y canario, for voice and small orchestra
Esquinas, for orchestra with soprano voice
"Ranas", for voice and piano
"El tecolote", for voice and piano
String Quartet No. 2
String Quartet No. 3
Ventanas, for orchestra
Wallingford Riegger – 
Canons for Woodwinds (Three), for flute, oboe, clarinet, bassoon, op.  9
Fantasy and Fugue, for orchestra and organ, op. 10
Vittorio Rieti – 
Preludes (Three), for piano
Serenata, for violin and eleven instruments or chamber orchestra
Symphony No. 2
Joaquín Rodrigo – Serenata española, for piano
Amadeo Roldán –
Tres toques, for orchestra
Curujey, son for choir, two pianos, and two percussionists
Guy Ropartz – L'indiscret, ballet, for orchestra
Hilding Rosenberg –
Female Choruses (Two)
Medea, incidental music for the play by Euripides
Song of Mourning and Pastoral (from the incidental music for Medea), female choir and piano
Albert Roussel – 
A Flower Given to my Daughter, for voice and piano
Idylles (Deux), for voice and piano, op. 44
Sonata No. 1, for violin and piano, in D minor, op. 11 (revised version)
Carl Ruggles – Sun-Treader, for orchestra
Harald Sæverud – 
Suite, for piano, op. 6
Variazioni piccole (50), for orchestra, op. 8
 – 
Aire de siembra, for orchestra
Canciones románticas peruanas, for voice and piano, no. 1: "Arrullo de muñeca", op. 17, no. 1
Canciones simbólicas (Tres), for voice and piano, op. 14
Kcachampa, for orchestra
Prelude, for string quartet, op. 15
Suite peruana, for piano, op. 16
Henri Sauguet – 
Divertissement de chambre, for flute, clarinet, bassoon, viola, and piano
Polymètres, for voice and piano
Franz Schmidt – Variationen über ein Husarenlied, for orchestra
Florent Schmitt – 
Choeurs (six), for four-part women's choir, a capella or with orchestra, op. 81
Symphonie concertante, for piano and orchestra, op. 82
Othmar Schoeck – Sonata in E major, for violin and piano, op.  46
Arnold Schoenberg –
Four-part Mirror Canon
Klavierstück, op. 33b
Mirror Canon, for string quartet
Two-part Mirror Canon for Herrmann Abraham "Spiegle Dich im Werk"
Erwin Schulhoff – Suite dansante en jazz, for piano
Cyril Scott –
Concerto, for cello and orchestra
Trio No. 1, for violin, viola, and cello
Trio No. 2, for violin, viola, and cello
Roger Sessions – Waltzes, for orchestra (lost)
Kaikhosru Shapurji Sorabji –
Movement for Voice and Piano
Piano Symphony No. 0
Vissarion Shebalin – Lenin, dramatic symphony for narrator, four vocal soloists, choir, and orchestra, op. 16
Nikos Skalkottas –
"O ti thel ē mana sou?" [Oh What Does Your Mother Want?], for voice and piano
Octet, for flute, oboe, clarinet, bassoon, two violins, viola, and cello
Piano Concerto No. 1
Richard Strauss – Kampf und Sieg, for orchestra
Igor Stravinsky – Violin Concerto in D
Josef Suk – Mass in B major, for SATB choir, strings, organ, and timpani (revised version)
Karol Szymanowski – Harnasie (ballet-pantomime), op. 55
Alexandre Tansman – 
Concertino, for piano and orchestra, 1931; 
Danses polonaises (quatre), for orchestra
Symphony no. 3 (Symphonie concertante), for violin, viola, cello, piano, and orchestra
Virgil Thomson –
La belle en dormant, for voice and piano
Chamber Music, for voice and piano
Serenade, for flute and violin
Stabat mater, for soprano and string quartet
String Quartet No. 1
Symphony No. 2
Randall Thompson – Symphony No. 2 in E minor
Michael Tippett – Symphonic Movement, for orchestra
Henri Tomasi –
Capriccio, for violin and orchestra
Chansons des sables, for voice and orchestra [from Tam-tam]
Chants de Cyrnos, for voice and orchestra or piano
Fantoches, for piano
Tam-tam, symphonic poem, for orchestra
Eduard Tubin – Süit eesti motiividel [Suite on Estoninian Motifs], for orchestra
Joaquín Turina – 
El castillo de Almodóvar, for piano (also orchestrated), op. 65
El circo, for piano, op. 68
Jardín de niños, for piano, op. 63
Pieza romántica, for piano, op. 64
Quartet, for violin, viola, cello, and piano, op. 67
Radio Madrid, for piano, op. 62,
Rapsodia sinfónica, for piano and strings op. 66
Sonata for Guitar, op. 61
Geirr Tveitt – Prillar, for orchestra
Edgard Varèse – Ionisation
Ralph Vaughan Williams –
Abinger (I Vow to Thee My Country)
Mantegna (Into the Woods My Master Went)
Marathon (Servants of the Great Adventure)
Piano Concerto in C major
White Gates (Fierce Raged the Tempest)
Louis Vierne – 
La ballade du désespéré, for soprano and orchestra, op. 61 
Triptyque, for organ,  op. 58,
Heitor Villa-Lobos –
Caixinha de música quebrada, for piano
String Quartet No. 5 (Quarteto brasileiro no. 1)
John Vincent – A Folk Song Symphony, for orchestra
William Walton –
Belshazzar's Feast (oratorio)
"Make we joy in this fest" (traditional carol), set for SATB choir
Kurt Weill – Mann ist Mann, incidental music to the play by Bertolt Brecht
Jaromir Weinberger –
Ouverture zu einem ritterlichen Spiel, for orchestra
Passacaglia, for orchestra with organ
Egon Wellesz – 
Mitte des Lebens, for soprano, choir, and orchestra, op. 45
Piano Concerto, op. 49
Mark Wessel –
Ballade, for violin, oboe, and string orchestra
Feminine Conversations and Promenade of Respectable People, for piano
Prelude and Fugue, for string quartet
Scherzo burlesque, for piano and orchestra
Sextet, for woodwinds and piano
String Quartet No. 1
Stefan Wolpe –
Lieder (Acht), for voice and piano
Die Mausefalle, incidental music for the play by Gustav von Wangenheim, for instrumental ensemble
Ivan Wyschnegradsky –
Deux études de concert, for two pianos tuned in quarter tones, op. 19
Etude en forme de scherzo, for two pianos tuned in quarter tones, op. 20
Riccardo Zandonai – Quadri di Segantini, for orchestra

Opera
Paul Abraham – Die Blume von Hawaii (operetta), staged 24 July, in Leipzig, Neues Theater
George Antheil – Helen Retires (not performed until 1934)
Arthur Benjamin – The Devil Take Her, staged 1 December, London, Royal College of Music
Alfredo Casella – La donna serpente, op. 50 (not performed until 1932)
Gustave Charpentier – Orphée (unfinished)
Werner Egk – Der Löwe und die Maus (children's opera)
George Enescu – Œdipe, op. 23 (not performed until 1936)
Walter Goehr – Malpopita (written for radio broadcast; first live performance 2004)
Louis Gruenberg – 
The Emperor Jones, op. 36 (not staged until 1933)
Jack and the Beanstalk, op. 35, staged 20 November, Juilliard School, New York
Jesús Guridi – La cautiva, staged 10 February, Calderón Theater, Madrid 
Arthur Honegger – La belle de Moudon (operetta), staged 30 May, in Mézières, Théâtre du Jorat (Switzerland)
Jacques Ibert – Gonzague, staged 17 December, Monte Carlo
Mikhail Ippolitov-Ivanov – Zhenit'ba [The Marriage], op. 70, staged 18 October at the Radio Theatre, Moscow [first of the four acts is by Musorgsky]
Lev Knipper – Goroda i godï [Cities and Years], op. 22
Eduard Künneke – Nadja, op. 28, performed in Kassel
Gian Francesco Malipiero –
Torneo notturno, staged 15 May at the Nationaltheater in Munich 
I trionfi d'amore, triptych (unperformed except for the second opera, Mascherati, not staged until 1954)
Italo Montemezzi – La notte di Zoraima, staged 31 January, Teatro alla Scala, Milan
Hans Pfitzner – Das Herz, op. 39, staged 12 November, simultaneously in Berlin and Munich
Jean Roger-Ducasse – Cantegril, staged 9 February at the Opéra-Comique (Salle Favart), Paris
Germaine Tailleferre – Zoulaina (never performed)
Deems Taylor – Peter Ibbetson, op. 20, staged 7 February, Metropolitan Opera, New York
Gabriel von Wayditch – Horus (not staged until 1939)
Egon Wellesz – Die Bakchantinnen, staged 20 June, Wiener Staatsoper, Vienna
Jaromir Weinberger – Milovaný hlas [Die geliebte Stimme], staged 28 February, Munich
Ermanno Wolf-Ferrari – La vedova scaltra, staged 5 March, at the Teatro dell'Opera di Roma, Rome
Eugène Ysaÿe – Piére li houïeu [Peter the Miner], staged 4 March in Liège

Film
Werner R. Heymann – Der Kongreß tanzt
Dmitri Shostakovich – Alone (1931 Soviet film)
Dmitri Shostakovich – Golden Mountains (film)

Jazz

Musical theater
 America's Sweetheart Broadway production opened at the Broadhurst Theatre on February 10 and ran for 135 performances.
 The Band Wagon     Broadway production opened at the New Amsterdam Theatre on June 3 and ran for 260 performances
 Bitter Sweet (Noël Coward) – London revival
 The Cat and the Fiddle     Broadway production opened at the Globe Theatre on October 15 and ran for 395 performances
 Cavalcade (Noël Coward) – London production opened at the Drury Lane Theatre on October 13 and ran for 405 performances
 Die Dubarry     Berlin production opened on August 14
 Folly To Be Wise London revue opened at the Piccadilly Theatre on January 8.  Starring Cicely Courtneidge.
 Here Goes the Bride Broadway production opened at Chanin's 46th Street Theatre on November 3 and ran for 7 performances.
 Hold My Hand (Music: Noel Gay Lyrics: Desmond Carter Book: Stanley Lupino) London production opened at the Gaiety Theatre on December 23.  Starring Jessie Matthews, Sonnie Hale and Stanley Lupino.
 The Land of Smiles  (Franz Lehár) – London production opened at the Drury Lane Theatre on May 8
 The Laugh Parade Broadway revue opened at the Imperial Theatre on November 2 and ran for 231 performances
 Of Thee I Sing Broadway production, opened December 26 and ran for 441 performances.
 The Third Little Show Broadway production opened at the Music Box Theatre on June 1 and ran for 136 performances
 Victoria and Her Hussar     London production opened at the Palace Theatre on September 17 and ran for 100 performances
 White Horse Inn London production opened at the Coliseum Theatre on April 8 and ran for 651 performances
 Ziegfeld Follies of 1931 Broadway revue opened at the Ziegfeld Theatre on July 1 and ran for 165 performances.

Musical films
 Alam Ara, starring Master Vithal and Zubeida, with music by Ferozshah M. Mistri and B. Irani
 A Caprice of Pompadour (Un caprice de la Pompadour), starring André Baugé
 Autumn Roses (Rosas de otoño), starring Francisco Canaro, with music by Guillermo Barbieri and José Rial
 Children of Dreams starring Margaret Schilling, Paul Gregory and Tom Patricola
 City of Song, starring Jan Kiepura, with music by Paul Abraham, Philip Braham and Ernesto Tagliaferri 
 The Cuban Love Song starring Lawrence Tibbett, Lupe Vélez, Jimmy Durante and Louise Fazenda
 Delicious starring Janet Gaynor, Charles Farrell and El Brendl.
 Die Fledermaus, starring Anny Ondra, Georg Alexander and Oskar Sima, with music by Johann Strauss II.
 Her Majesty, Love starring Marilyn Miller
 The Hot Heiress starring Ben Lyon and Ona Munson
 Huwen op Bevel 
 Kiss Me Again starring Bernice Claire and Edward Everett Horton
 Madame Pompadour (Die Marquise von Pompadour), starring Anny Ahlers, Kurt Gerron and Walter Jankuhn, with music by Eduard Künneke, Rudolf Nelson and Robert Stolz 
 Le Million starring Annabella and René Lefèvre
 Palmy Days starring Eddie Cantor and Charlotte Greenwood
 Pardon Us starring Stan Laurel and Oliver Hardy.  Directed by James Parrott.
 The Prodigal starring Lawrence Tibbett
 Sally in Our Alley starring Gracie Fields
 Showgirl's Luck starring Susan Denis, Arthur Tauchert, Arthur Clarke and Fred Bluett
 The Private Secretary (Die Privatsekretärin), starring Renate Müller, Hermann Thimig and Felix Bressart, with music by Paul Abraham and Lajos Lajtai 
 The Smiling Lieutenant starring Maurice Chevalier, Claudette Colbert and Miriam Hopkins
 Sunshine Susie starring Renate Müller and Jack Hulbert

Births
January 5 – Alfred Brendel, pianist
January 8 – Bill Graham, rock music entrepreneur (died 1991)
January 12 – Roland Alphonso, saxophonist (died 1998)
January 14 – Caterina Valente, multilingual singer
January 21 – Rudi Maugeri, pop singer (The Crew-Cuts) (died 2004)
January 22 – Sam Cooke, singer (died 1964)
January 26 – Kaare Ørnung, Norwegian pianist, music teacher (died 2013)
January 29 – Leslie Bricusse, film and stage composer and lyricist (died 2021)
February 12 – Walt Groller, accordionist and polka musician
February 14 – Phyllis McGuire, vocalist (The McGuire Sisters) (died 2020)
March 5 – Barry Tuckwell, horn player (died 2020)
March 15 – D. J. Fontana, drummer (died 2018)
March 25
Vytautas Barkauskas, composer (died 2020)
Humphrey Burton, television music and arts presenter
Paul Motian, jazz drummer (died 2011)
April 29 – Lonnie Donegan, skiffle musician (died 2002)
May 4 – Ed Cassidy, drummer (Spirit) (died 2012)
May 7 – Teresa Brewer, singer (died 2007)
May 14 
Aloys Kontarsky, pianist (died 2017)
Alvin Lucier, composer
May 19 – Éric Tappy, Swiss tenor
June 10 – João Gilberto, bossa nova musician (died 2019)
June 11
Margarita Pracatan, Cuban-born novelty singer (died 2020)
Audrey Schuh, American soprano
June 17 – Dominic Frontiere, accordionist and composer (died 2017)
July 6 – Della Reese, actress and singer (died 2017)
July 10 – Jerry Herman, American musical theater composer and lyricist (died 2019)
July 11 – Tab Hunter, actor and singer (died 2018)
July 18 – Papa Dee Allen, funk musician (War) (died 1988)
July 21 – Plas Johnson, American saxophonist (B. Bumble and the Stingers and The Wrecking Crew)
July 31
Kenny Burrell, jazz guitarist
Morey Carr (The Playmates) (died 1987)
August 1 – Rostislav Grigor'yevich Boyko, Russian composer and conductor (died 2002) 
August 28
John Perkins (The Crew-Cuts)
John Shirley-Quirk, operatic bass-baritone (died 2014)
 September 1
 Richard Hundley, American pianist, composer (died 2018)
 Javier Solís, Mexican ranchera & bolero singer (died 1966)
 September 4 – Mitzi Gaynor, actress and singer
September 12 – George Jones, country singer (died 2013)
September 19 – Brook Benton, singer and songwriter (died 1988)
September 22 – George Chambers (The Chambers Brothers) (died 2019)
September 24 – Anthony Newley, English songwriter, actor and singer (died 1999)
October 1 – Alan Wagner, American opera critic (died 2007)
October 15 – Freddy Cole,  jazz singer and pianist (died 2020)
October 24 – Sofia Gubaidulina, composer
November 2 – Phil Woods, jazz saxophonist (died 2015)
November 5 – Ike Turner, musician and record producer (died 2007)
November 16 
Bob Gibson, folk musician (died 1996)
Hubert Sumlin, blues guitarist (died 2011)
December 21 – David Baker, American composer and educator (died 2016)
December 24
Ray Bryant, jazz pianist (died 2011)
Mauricio Kagel, composer (died 2008)
December 27 – Scotty Moore, guitarist (died 2016)
December 30 – Skeeter Davis, country singer (died 2004)

Deaths
January 5 – Colonel Charles Gerard Conn, instrument manufacturer (born 1884)
January 21 – Felix Blumenfeld, pianist, conductor and composer (born 1863)
January 23 – Anna Pavlova, ballerina (born 1881)
February 16 – Dirk Schäfer, pianist and composer (born 1873)
February 23
Mario Ancona, bel canto baritone (born 1860)
Dame Nellie Melba, operatic soprano (born 1861)
March 25 – Tomasz Bartkiewcz, organist and composer (born 1865)
April 4 – George Whitefield Chadwick, composer (born 1854)
May 8
Bertha Lewis, singer and actress with the D'Oyly Carte Opera Company (born 1887) (car accident)
Paolo Litta, composer (born 1871)
May 12 – Eugène Ysaÿe, violinist and composer (born 1858)
May 13 – Josif Marinković, composer (born 1851)
June 18 – Fanny Holland, singer and actress (born 1847)
June 21 – Jimmy Blythe, jazz pianist (born 1901)
July 2 – Charles Quef, organist and composer (born 1873)
July 4 – Buddy Petit, jazz cornet player (born c. 1890)
July 23 – William Wolstenholme, organist and composer (born 1865)
August 6 – Bix Beiderbecke, jazz musician (born 1903)
August 11 – Linda Loredo, dancer (born 1907)
August 19 – Francisco Cimadevilla González, guitarist and composer (born 1861)
August 22 – Joseph Tabrar, songwriter (born 1857)
August 26 – Heinrich Grünfeld, cellist (born 1855)
August 28 – Jane Green singer (born 1897)
September 3 – Franz Schalk, conductor (born 1863)
September 6 – Juliana Walanika, the "Hawaiian Nightingale", court singer (born 1846)
September 10 – Alfonso Rendano, pianist, inventor of the "third pedal" (born 1853)
September 20 – Ugo Falena, opera librettist (born 1875)
September 23
Harry Macdonough, pioneer recording artist (born 1871)
Adolf Weidig, composer (born 1867)
October 3 – Carl Nielsen, composer (born 1865)
October 8 – Luigi von Kunits, violinist, conductor and composer (born 1870)
October 18 – Thomas Edison, inventor of the phonograph (born 1847)
October 20 – Emánuel Moór, pianist, composer and inventor of the Duplex-Coupler Grand Pianoforte (born 1863)
October 21 – Barbecue Bob, blues musician (born 1902)
October 29 – Luciano Gallet, composer (born 1893)
November 4 – Buddy Bolden, jazz musician (born 1877)
November 17 – Georgi Atanasov, composer (born 1882)
November 19 – Frederic Cliffe, composer (born 1857)
November 23 – Leonora Braham, operatic soprano and actress (Gilbert & Sullivan) (born 1853)
December 2 – Vincent d'Indy, composer (born 1851)

References

 
20th century in music
Music by year